KWGS 89.5 FM is the flagship National Public Radio station in Tulsa, Oklahoma. The station was Oklahoma's first FM radio station and is one of two stations operated by the University of Tulsa. The station was established in 1947 through the initiative of TU speech professor Ben Graf Henneke, later president of the university. The call letters are the initials of Tulsa oil man and philanthropist William G. Skelly, who provided the funding.

TU's other radio station is a classical music station, KWTU.

KWGS is licensed by the U.S. Federal Communications Commission to broadcast in the HD (hybrid) format.

References

External links

Voices of Oklahoma interview with Ed Dumit. First person interview conducted on September 29, 2011 with Ed Dumit, former art producer for KWGS. 

WGS
NPR member stations
University of Tulsa
1947 establishments in Oklahoma
Radio stations established in 1947